A rally against homophobia was held in Tbilisi, Georgia, on May 17, 2013, the International Day Against Homophobia. Gay rights activists holding the rally were met by thousands of protestors opposing homosexuality, who were allowed to break through a police cordon and violently pursued them, beating and throwing stones at them.

Two days earlier, Ilia II of Georgia, the head of the Georgian Orthodox Church, had called for banning the gay rights rally, describing homosexuality as an "anomaly and disease." The day before the rally, Prime Minister Bidzina Ivanishvili stated that LGBT individuals "have the same rights as any other social groups" in Georgia.

Dozens of gay rights activists had gathered in downtown Tbilisi for the rally. A reported 20,000 Georgian Orthodox church members protested, led by church priests, and a clash ensued in Pushkin Park, near Freedom Square. Police forces did not prevent the homophobic protesters from running at the anti-homophobia rally participants, as priests asked. Anti-homophobia demonstrators were evacuated by the police in buses, which were attacked by the counter-demonstrators. 17 people were injured in the clashes.

Reaction
The violence was widely condemned by foreign embassies, and non-governmental organisations including Transparency Georgia, the Georgian Young Lawyers' Organization and Amnesty International. Ilia II of Georgia condemned any violence, but reiterated his view that homosexuality is a sin and should not be popularized. The Ministry of Internal Affairs launched an investigation and promised prosecution of the perpetrators. Paul Rimple and Mark Mullen have described the events as part of a larger struggle between the church and the secular government.

On the 16th of December 2021, the European Court of Human Rights judged that the failure to protect the demonstration by Georgia state was a violation of the articles 3, 14 and 11 of the European Convention on Human Rights.

See also

 LGBT rights in Georgia
 2021 attack on Tbilisi Pride

References

2013 in Georgia (country)
2013 in LGBT history
2013 riots
LGBT in Georgia (country)
LGBT-related riots
Protests in Georgia (country)
2010s in Tbilisi
May 2013 events in Asia